Talang Rural District is a rural district (dehestan) in Talang District, Qasr-e Qand County, Sistan and Baluchestan province, Iran. At the 2006 census, its population was 14,251, in 3,064 families.  The rural district has 57 villages.

References 

Rural Districts of Sistan and Baluchestan Province
Qasr-e Qand County